Biodiversity Conservation Act 2016
may refer to:

Biodiversity Conservation Act 2016 (WA)
Biodiversity Conservation Act 2016 (NSW)